Robert Bruce Ammons (February 27, 1920 – May 21, 1999) was the founder, along with his wife Carol H. Ammons, of Psychological Reports and Perceptual and Motor Skills. He received his Ph.D. in clinical and experimental psychology from the University of Iowa in 1946. He was a psychology professor at the University of Montana in Missoula.

Ammons was a Fellow of the American Association for the Advancement of Science, and of several divisions of the American Psychological Association.

The Ammons are also known for developing the Ammons Quick Test of intelligence, a short (five minutes) intelligence test for adults, consisting of an orally administered picture vocabulary test. It is mostly used for pre-screening the elderly, particularly because it minimizes fatigue. Its results correlate highly with those of the Wechsler Adult Intelligence Scale, particularly with the verbal IQ scale. It also benefits from simple and objective scoring.

References

1920 births
1999 deaths
University of North Dakota faculty
Fellows of the American Association for the Advancement of Science
20th-century American physicians
University of Iowa alumni
University of Montana faculty
American psychologists